F. Reid Shippen is a mixer, engineer and producer currently based in Nashville. He has mixed a wide variety of records including "Cosmic Hallelujah" by Kenny Chesney, "Lights Out" by Ingrid Michaelson, "The Mountain" by Dierks Bentley, "When I Was Younger" by Colony House, and "Eye On It" by TobyMac. Shippen has mixed nine Grammy Award winning projects and received the Audio Engineer of the Year award at the 54th Annual Academy of Country Music Awards.

Biography 
Growing up in Fair Haven, New Jersey, F. Reid Shippen performed in bands and eventually decided that he wanted to pursue a career in music. He attended Middle Tennessee State University graduating with degrees in business and recording arts & sciences. While in college, Shippen interned at a variety of studios in Nashville including Quad Studios and Skylab Studios, quickly transitioning from assisting to engineering. In 1999, he began to concentrate on mixing.

With many years of experience in the studio, Shippen has mixed multiple platinum and gold records and hundreds of charting singles and albums, including nine Grammy Award-winners. He was awarded Audio Engineer of the Year at the 54th Annual Academy of Country Music Awards.

Shippen has mixed, engineered, and/or produced music for respected artists in a variety of genres from Death Cab for Cutie, A Fine Frenzy, Cage the Elephant and India.Arie to the Jonas Brothers, Marc Broussard, Eric Church and Robert Randolph. He has also worked with Clay Aiken, Jonny Lang, Flyleaf, Switchfoot, Backstreet Boys, Third Day, MercyMe, and Newsboys among others. Most recently he won a Grammy for his work on Gloria Gaynor's album Testimony for which he was a co-producer, mixer, and engineer.

Shippen resides in Nashville, Tennessee and works out of Robot Lemon, his private Solid State Logic hybrid studio, where he mixes. In addition to mixing, Shippen produces, records and is actively involved in artist development. In 2018, he founded SongFarm alongside songwriter Ross Copperman, a non-profit organization that builds recording studios and provides musical creative opportunities for under-served high schools. Shippen is also a co-founder of the audio gear company Atomic Instrument Co., but is no longer associated with the company. He is an affiliated artist with various audio gear brands including sE Electronics, Unity Audio, and Chandler Limited.

Select discography

Songs on compilations

 Shania Twain – "Today (Is Your Day)" (Mercury Records)
 Minus the Bear – "My Time" (Radio Mix) (Dangerbird)
 A Fine Frenzy – "Happier" (Radio Mix) (Virgin/EMI)
 Flyleaf – "All Around Me" (Radio Mix) (Octone/Universal)
 Needtobreathe – "You Are Here" (Radio Mix) (Sparrow/Lava/Atlantic)
 Robert Randolph and the Family Band – "Get There" (Warner Bros.)
 Uncle Kracker – "All I Can Do Is Write About It" (from Sweet Home Alabama: The Country Music Tribute to Lynyrd Skynyrd) (Hip-O/Universal)
 Death Cab for Cutie – "Little Boxes" (for Showtime series Weeds) (Lionsgate)
 Jonas Brothers – "Poor Unfortunate Souls" (from The Little Mermaid Soundtrack) (Walt Disney)

Awards

Affiliated studios

Current
 Robot Lemon (Nashville, TN) – 2009–present (Owner)

Past
 Battery Studios (Nashville, TN)
 Masterfonics (Nashville, TN)
 Oceanway Studios (Nashville, TN)
 Quad Studios (Nashville, TN)
 Recording Arts (Nashville, TN): 1999–2004
 Skylab Studios (Nashville, TN)
 Sound Kitchen (Franklin, TN)
 Sound Stage Studios (Nashville, TN): 2004–2009

References

External links
 
 [ AllMusic.com Page]
 Discogs.com Page
 AlbumCredits.com Discography
 SongFarm website

1974 births
Living people
American audio engineers
Record producers from New Jersey
People from Fair Haven, New Jersey
Engineers from New Jersey
Grammy Award winners